Ion Monea (30 November 19401 March 2011) was a Romanian amateur boxer. He competed as a middleweight in 1960–64 and won a bronze medal at the 1960 Olympics and a silver medal at the 1963 European Championships, placing fifth at the 1964 Olympics. He then moved up to the light-heavyweight division and won three more medals, at the 1967 and 1969 European championships and 1968 Olympics, losing on all three occasions to Danas Pozniakas. He did not fight Pozniakas in 1968 though, as he had a broken nose from his previous bout and withdrew from the Olympic final.

Monea was trained by Constantin Nour, whom he called the "most competent and gifted trainer". After retiring from competitions he also worked as a boxing coach at Dinamo Bucharest. His trainees included Daniel Dumitrescu and Rudel Obreja.

1964 Olympic results
Below is the record of Ion Monea, a Romanian middleweight boxer who competed at the 1964 Tokyo Olympics:

 Round of 32: bye
 Round of 16: defeated Kim Deok-pal (South Korea) by decision, 5-0
 Quarterfinal: lost to Emil Schulz (Unified Team of Germany) by decision, 0-5

References

External links

1960 Romanian National Championships
1961 Romanian National Championships
1962 Romanian National Championships
1963 Romanian National Championships
1964 Romanian National Championships
1965 Romanian National Championships
1966 Romanian National Championships
1967 Romanian National Championships
1968 Romanian National Championships
1969 Romanian National Championships
1971 Romanian National Championships

1940 births
2011 deaths
Light-heavyweight boxers
Middleweight boxers
Boxers at the 1968 Summer Olympics
Boxers at the 1964 Summer Olympics
Boxers at the 1960 Summer Olympics
Olympic boxers of Romania
Olympic bronze medalists for Romania
Olympic silver medalists for Romania
Olympic medalists in boxing
Medalists at the 1960 Summer Olympics
Medalists at the 1968 Summer Olympics
Romanian male boxers
People from Zărnești